Shahi cabinet may refer to:

 Mahendra Bahadur Shahi cabinet (2018), council for the Chief Minister of Nepal's Karnali Province formed on 16 February 2018
 Jeevan Bahadur Shahi cabinet (2021), council for the Chief Minister of Karnali Province formed on 3 November 2021